The red-naped bushshrike or red-naped boubou (Laniarius ruficeps) is a species of bird in the family Malaconotidae, which is native to the dry lowlands of the eastern Afrotropics.

Range and habitat
It is found in Ethiopia, Kenya, and Somalia.

Habits
It is a shy and skulking bird, that forages on the ground and in the lower strata of dense thickets and thornbush. It sings just after sunrise from a bushtop. They have various harsh and repetitive calls, which includes dueting.

Subspecies
There are three accepted subspecies:
 L. r. ruficeps (Shelley, 1885) – northern Somalia
Description: Crown to hindneck bright orange-rufous to rufous-red, forecrown black
 L. r. rufinuchalis (Sharpe, 1895) – Ethiopia, central Somalia and Kenya
Description: Forecrown black
 L. r. kismayensis (Erlanger, 1901) – coastal Somalia and Kiunga, Kenya
Description: Forecrown orange-red

References

red-naped bushshrike
Birds of the Horn of Africa
red-naped bushshrike
Taxonomy articles created by Polbot